Eugênio Rômulo Togni (born 9 September 1982) is a Brazilian football coach and a former player. He is currently the head coach of Italian Serie D club Athletic Carpi.

Playing career
Togni joined his first Italy side Bellunoponte in September 2002. In 2003–04 season, he joined Manfredonia, also at Serie D, where he won the champion. He followed Manfredonia to play at Serie C2 and won champion again in 2005. He played at Serie C1 until joined Serie B side Arezzo in January 2007 but relegated to Serie C1 in June 2007.
On 12 July 2010, he was signed by Sorrento on a free transfer.

Coaching career
After retiring as a player in December 2017, Togni stayed on at Serie D club Mezzolara as an assistant coach. On 31 May 2018 he was promoted as head coach.

In June 2021, Togni left Mezzolara after three seasons in charge of the club.

On 14 December 2021, he was hired as the new head coach of ambitious Serie D club Athletic Carpi, unofficial heir of the defunct Carpi club.

Honours
Serie B: 2012
Serie C2: 2005
Serie D: 2003, 2004

References

 Romulo Togni, Rescissione Contratto con I'Avellino: Ufficiale a breve, avellino-calcio.it, 5 January 2016

External links
 Profile at CBF 
 Profile at AIC.Football.it 
 Profile at La Gazzetta dello Sport (2006–07) 
 

1982 births
Living people
Sportspeople from Rio Grande do Sul
Brazilian footballers
Association football midfielders
Brazilian expatriate footballers
Expatriate footballers in Italy
Serie A players
Serie B players
Serie C players
Manfredonia Calcio players
S.S. Arezzo players
A.S.D. Sorrento players
Delfino Pescara 1936 players
U.S. Avellino 1912 players
S.P.A.L. players
S.S. Maceratese 1922 players
Brazilian football managers
Brazilian expatriate football managers
Expatriate football managers in Italy
A.S.D. Mezzolara players
A.S.D. Mezzolara managers